is a city located in Aichi Prefecture, Japan.

Geography
Inazawa is located in the flatlands of far western Aichi Prefecture, bordering Gifu Prefecture on the west. Both the Kiso River and the Gojō River flow through the city.

Climate
The city has a climate characterized by hot and humid summers, and relatively mild winters (Köppen climate classification Cfa).

Demographics
Per Japanese census data, the population of Inazawa has been relatively steady over the past 30 years.

Surrounding municipalities
Aichi Prefecture
Ichinomiya
Aisai
Kiyosu
Ama
Gifu Prefecture
Hashima
Kaizu

History

Ancient history
Inazawa is the location of the Nara period provincial capital and provincial temple of Owari Province.

The Owari Onkunitama Jinja, an important Shinto shrine located within the borders of the present city, also dates from this period.

Early modern period
During the Edo period, Inaba and Ozawa villages formed a post town on the Minoji, a kaidō connecting Miya-juku (Atsuta on the Tōkaidō to Tarui-juku (Mino Province) on the Nakasendō.

Late modern period
In the early Meiji period establishment of the modern municipalities system, the town of Inazawa was created.

Contemporary history
The area of the town was expanded in 1907 and 1955 through the annexation of neighboring villages, and on November 1, 1958, the Inazawa was elevated to city status.

On April 1, 2005, the towns of Heiwa and Sobue (both from Nakashima District) were merged into Inazawa.

Government

Inazawa has a mayor-council form of government with a directly elected mayor and a unicameral city legislature of 26 members. The city contributes two members to the Aichi Prefectural Assembly.  In terms of national politics, the city is part of Aichi District 9 of the lower house of the Diet of Japan.

External relations

Twin towns – Sister cities

International
Olympia（Elis, Western Greece, Greece）
since August 22, 1987.
Chifeng（Inner Mongolia, China）
since May 16, 1989.

Education

University
Nagoya Bunri University

College
Aichi Bunkyo Women's College

Schools
Inazawa has 23 public elementary schools and nine public junior high schools operated by the city government, and three public high schools operated by the Aichi Prefectural Board of Education. There are also one private high school. The prefecture also operates one special education school for the handicapped.

Economy

Primary sector of the economy

Agriculture
Inazawa is a regional commercial center and has traditionally been known for its production of vegetables and gingko nuts.

Secondary sector of the economy

Manufacturing
Sony and Toyoda Gosei have large production plants in the city.

Tertiary sector of the economy

Commerce
Due to its transportation connections with the Nagoya metropolis, Inazawa is increasingly becoming a commuter town.

Companies headquartered in Inazawa
Uny, supermarket chain
Aikoku Alpha Corporation, automotive components
Toshin Housing Company, construction
Fujikei Kyoi, sake brewing

Transportation

Railways

Conventional lines
 Central Japan Railway Company
Tokaido Main Line：-  –  –
 Meitetsu
Nagoya Main Line：-  –  –  –  –
Bisai Line:-  – (Fuchidaka) –  –  –  –  –

Roads

Expressways
 Meishin Expressway

Japan National Route

Local attractions

Castles
Orizu Castle
Shobata Castle
Shrines and Temples
Owari Kokubun-ji 
Yawase Kannon Temple
Owari Ōkunitama Jinja
Natural attractions
Sobue Dune
Cultural events
Hadaka Matsuri on the 12th day of the new Chinese Year
Buildings and structures
Solae (tower) – Inazawa is the location of the Solae elevator testing tower, previously the highest such tower in the world, but now surpassed by the Kunshan Test Tower in China.

Notable people from Inazawa
Mineo Ōsumi, admiral, Imperial Japanese Navy
Takanori Ogisu, artist
Seiko Niizuma, actress and singer
Nana Seino, actress and model
Masaichi Kaneda, professional baseball player
Junki Ito, professional baseball player
Wataru Sakata, professional wrestler

References

External links

 

 
Cities in Aichi Prefecture